Caravana de Campeones (May 2012) (Spanish for "Caravana of Champions") was an annual professional wrestling major event produced and scripted by Mexican professional wrestling promotion International Wrestling Revolution Group (IWRG), which took place on April 6, 2012 in Arena Naucalpan, Naucalpan, State of Mexico, Mexico. The events always feature multiple title matches, in this case three championships were defended and IWRG held a tournament to determine the next holder of the IWRG Intercontinental Middleweight Championship which was declared vacant in the weeks prior to the Caravana de Campeones show.

The May 2012 version of the event was the fourth overall show IWRG has held under the Caravana de Campeones banner. The event featured eleven professional wrestling matches with different wrestlers involved in pre-existing scripted feuds or storylines. Being a professional wrestling event matches are not won legitimately through athletic competition; they are instead won via predetermined outcomes to the matches that is kept secret from the general public.

Production

Background
Professional wrestling has a long running tradition of holding shows that feature several championship matches, and at times actually promotes shows as an "all championship matches" show. The earliest documented "All-Championship" show is the EMLL Carnaval de Campeones ("Carnival of Champions") held on January 13, 1965. In 2007 WWE held a pay-per-view called Vengeance: Night of Champions, making WWE Night of Champions a recurring theme. Starting in 2008 the Mexican lucha libre promotion International Wrestling Revolution Group (IWRG) has held a regular major show labeled Caravana de Campeones, Spanish for "Caravan of Champions" using the same concept for a major annual show. All Caravana de Campeones shows have been held in Arena Naucalpan, IWRG's home arena, the location of all of their major shows through the years. The April 2012 show was the fourth time IWRG has held a Caravana de Campeones show, having not held one in 2010 but held twice in 2012.

Storylines
The event featured twelve professional wrestling matches with different wrestlers involved in pre-existing scripted feuds, plots and storylines. Wrestlers portrayed themselves as either heels (referred to as rudos in Mexico, those that portray the "bad guys") or faces (técnicos in Mexico, the "good guy" characters) as they follow a series of tension-building events, which culminated in wrestling matches.

In 2007 Negro Casas won the championship by defeating Villano III to win the vacant championship. Casas worked for Consejo Mundial de Lucha Libre (CMLL) who had worked with IWRG for many years, but in late 2007 the relationship was broken off and Casas ceased working for IWRG, but never lost the championship in the ring. On May 1, 2012 IWRG officially declared the championship vacant as they announced that the 2012 Caravana de Campeones would host an eight-man tourmant for the championship.

On December 22, 2011 Carta Brava Jr. defeated Dinamic Black to win the IWRG Intercontinental Lightweight Championship, becoming the 10th over-all champion. The championship had been defended, and changed hands at each of the previous three championships and with the April 2012 Caravana de Campeones it became the only championship to have been featured on all four shows held up to that point.

La Dinastia de la Muerte ("The Dynasty of Death"; the father/son team of Negro Navarro and Trauma I) became the 18th overall holders of the IWRG Intercontinental Tag Team Championship on March 18, 2012 when they defeated Las Piratas (El Hijo del Pirata Morgan and Pirata Morgan). the May Caravana de Campeones would be the first time the team put the championship on the line after winning it.

In 2010 El Hijo del Diablo appeared at an IWRG event with the WWS World Welterweight Championship around his waist, claiming that he won it on the independent circuit, but never specified when or from who. Over the following years IWRG allowed the championship to be defended on their shows despite not originating in IWRG. The champion prior to Caravna de Campeons was Eterno, who had defeated Multifacético to win the title on November 3, 2011.

Results

References

External links 
IWRG Official website

2012 in professional wrestling
2012 in Mexico
May 2012 events in Mexico
2012.5